Ajan Suunta (Direction of Time) was the newspaper of the Finnish Patriotic People's Movement (IKL) that ran from 1932 to 1944. IKL published thirty newspapers and magazines, but the daily newspaper Ajan Suunta was the main organ of the party. Ajan Suunta was preceded by the newspaper Ajan Sana (Word of Time) published from 1930 to 1932.

Content

The newspaper was aggressive in its style, referring to itself as a "fighting journal", "weapon in the combat against un-Finnish forces". This was especially true under Arne Somersalo, when the magazine got in trouble with censors multiple times. Ajan Suunta was also deeply hostile to Jews, published anti-Semitic caricatures and connected Judaism to everything the IKL stood against like Marxism, freemasonry and liberalism. Ajan Suunta in general praised Hitler, taking the side of the Nazi government, blaming the anti-Semitic measures and the Night of Broken Glass on the "Jewish parasites", noting the restrain shown by the Nazis. Ajan Suunta would also frequently refer to and quote the Protocols of the Elders of Zion. Editor-in-chief Arne Somersalo even visited Hitler and Mussolini and gifted them Ostrobothnian knives. 

In addition to strong antisemitism, Ajan Suunta was also anti-Swedish and anti-Russian. As the Jews in Finland mostly spoke either Russian or Swedish, the anti-Swedishness, Russophobia and antisemitism all complemented one another, leading Ajan Suunta to rail against "Swede-kikes" and "Russkie-loving Judeo-internationale". However, Ajan Suunta was not the most extreme newspaper published in Finland, for example the newspaper's competitors Hakaristi (Swastika) and Työrintama (Labor Front) continuously agitated for a "solution" to the Jewish Question, Työrintama publishing "humorous" cartoons of Jews digging their own graves. During the Continuation War the magazine reported ecstatically on the Finnish-German cooperation and brotherhood in arms.

Bannings
Ajan Suunta consistently caused problems for the authorities and censors both home and abroad. As IKL was close allies with the Estonian Vaps Movement, Ajan Suunta published critical articles about Konstantin Päts' Estonia. For example, the following was published in 1933: "Estonia's government and center parties have sold themselves to the Marxists." As a response, Ajan Suunta was banned in Estonia for two years. On 22 December 1936, Ajan Suunta announced that 18 Estonian politicians, including ministers and leading politicians, had submitted a highly critical memorandum to Prime Minister Konstantin Päts. Päts responded that if the memorandum was to be published, he would imprison all 18.

The newspaper was finally banned for good after the Moscow Armistice in 1944, a week and a half after the party itself. Pavel Orlov, a political adviser to the Allied Control Commission, had demanded that the Finnish government shut down the magazine immediately, and the newspaper's board was contacted. The printing presses were stopped voluntarily after the government warned that otherwise there might be force measures against the entire Finnish press.

References

Archives
 National Library digital archives of Ajan Suunta

External links

1932 establishments in Finland
Antisemitism in Finland
Antisemitic publications
Propaganda newspapers and magazines
1944 disestablishments in Finland
Defunct daily newspapers
Publications established in 1932
Publications disestablished in 1944
Fascist newspapers and magazines
Defunct newspapers published in Finland